Balaji Bajirao (8 December 1720 – 23 June 1761), often referred to as Nana Saheb I, was the 8th Peshwa  of the Maratha Confederacy in India. He was appointed as Peshwa in 1740 upon the death of his illustrious father, the Peshwa Bajirao I.

During his tenure, the Chhatrapati (Maratha Emperor) was a mere figurehead. At the same time, the Maratha empire started transforming into a confederacy, in which individual chiefs—such as the Holkars, the Scindias and the Bhonsles of Nagpur kingdom—became more powerful. During Balaji Rao's tenure, the Maratha territory reached its zenith. A large part of this expansion, however, was led by the individual chiefs of the Maratha Empire.

Balaji Bajirao was an astute strategist, a shrewd diplomat and an accomplished statesman. He, along with his cousin Sadashivrao Bhau, introduced new legislative and financial systems in the state. Under his leadership, the borders of the Maratha Empire expanded to Peshawar in present-day Pakistan, Srirangapatna in the South, and Medinipur in present-day West Bengal. Nanasaheb built canals, bridges, temples and lodges for travellers in the capital city of Pune and in other parts of the Maratha Empire. In his twenty-year reign as the Peshwa, Nanasaheb subdued three major powers under his tenure, viz. Mughals in the North, the Nizam in the South and the Bengal Sultanate. Along with that he also weakened the Afghan control over Punjab, stopped their repeated invasions on the imperial capital of Delhi, subdued the Rajputs and Rohillas and neutralized the state of Oudh. He greatly improved the condition of peasants and brought remarkable changes in the state of agriculture. Many successful economic changes took place during his tenure.

Early years and family

Balaji Rao was born in the Bhat family, to Peshwa Baji Rao I, on 8 December 1720. After Bajirao's death in April 1740, Chhatrapati Shahu appointed 19-year old Balaji as the Peshwa in August 1740, despite opposition from other chiefs such as Raghoji I Bhonsle. Radhabai, the Grandmother of Balaji bajirao Gopikabai, a noble girl aged 6, during her visit to the Raste family. She was impressed by Gopikabai's Orthodox Hindu upbringings as she was well versed in priestly religious matters and the prevailing customs followed in priestly Brahmin families. Despite her young age, Radhabai proposed the marriage of Gopikabai to her Grandson Balaji Bajirao, who was 10 at the time. The two eventually got married on 11 January 1730.

The couple had three sons, Vishwasrao who died in the battle of Panipat in 1761, Madhavrao who succeeded Nanasaheb as Peshwa and Narayanrao who succeeded Madhavrao in his late teens. Nanasaheb had an able brother called Raghunathrao whose ambitions to be the Peshwa became disastrous for the Maratha empire.

Rivalry with Raghoji Bhonsle 

In early years of Balaji Rao's tenure, Raghoji I Bhonsle helped extend Maratha influence in South and East India. However, he was not on good terms with the Peshwa. Shortly before Balaji's appointment as the Peshwa, Raghoji had led a Maratha force to South India. His mission was to help Pratap Singh of Thanjavur, a royal of the Bhonsle clan, against Dost Ali Khan. Raghoji killed Dost Ali in May 1740, and installed Dost Ali's son Safdar Ali Khan as the Nawab of Arcot. He returned to Satara, and unsuccessfully lodged a protest against Balaji Rao's appointment as the Peshwa. He then returned to South India, where he defeated Chanda Sahib in March 1741, before being forced to retreat by Chanda Sahib's French allies from Pondicherry. After returning to Satara, Raghoji continued to oppose Balaji Rao.

In 1743, Raghoji Bhonsle attacked Alivardi Khan's forces in Orissa. Khan paid  2,000,000 to Balaji Rao, who helped him expel Raghoji from Orissa in 1744. Raghoji then complained to Chhatrapati Shahu, and got himself appointed the in-charge of Marathas in Orissa, Bengal and Bihar. By 1752, Raghoji had taken over administration of Orissa, and also frequently raided Bengal and Bihar to collect chauth. The instability brought by him to Bengal later paved way for the rise of the East India Company there.

Rebellion by Tarabai and Umabai 

Tarabai, the senior widow of Rajaram Chhatrapati after being released by her stepson Sambhaji II of Kolhapur was given asylum by Chhatrapati Shahu, her nephew. In the 1740s, during the last years of Shahu's life, Tarabai brought a child to him: Rajaram II. She presented the child as her grandson, and thus, a direct descendant of Shivaji. Shahu adopted the child, and after his death in 1749, Rajaram II succeeded him as the Chhatrapati. The next year, Peshwa Balaji Rao left to fight against the Nizam of Hyderabad. In his absence, Tarabai urged Rajaram II to remove him from the post of Peshwa. When Rajaram refused, she imprisoned him in a dungeon at Satara, on 24 November 1750. She claimed that he was an impostor, and that she had falsely presented him as her grandson. Tarabai was unsuccessful in getting support from other ministers and the would-be Nizam Salabat Jung. However, she managed to enlist the help of another noblewoman, Umabai Dabhade.

Umabai Dabhade was the matriarch of the Dabhade family, whose members held the title of Senapati (commander-in-chief) and controlled several territories in Gujarat. Her husband had been killed by the Mughals, and her eldest son had been killed by Balaji Rao's father for a rebellion against Chhatrapati Shahu. However, Shahu had forgiven the Dabhades and allowed them to retain their jagirs and titles on the condition that they would remit half of the revenues collected from Gujarat to his treasury. Umabai's minor son Yashwant Rao was made the titular Senapati, while she held the actual executive power in Maratha territories of Gujarat. The Dabhades never actually shared any revenues, but Shahu did not want to take any action against a grieving mother. However, after Shahu's death Peshwa Balaji Rao faced an empty treasury and pressurized the Dabhades to share Gujarat revenues as per the agreement. Umabai personally met him in 1750 and argued that the agreement was void because the Dabhades had signed it under force. The Peshwa refused to entertain this argument.

Umabai dispatched 15,000 troops led by her lieutenant Damaji Rao Gaekwad in support of Tarabai's rebellion. Gaekwad initially advanced towards Pune, prompting the Peshwa's mother Kashibai and his grandmother Radhabai to flee from Pune to Sinhagad. While encamped at Pargaon near Pune, he received a letter from the Peshwa loyalist Mahadji Purandare, who denounced him as a traitor. Subsequently, Gaekwad changed course and started advancing towards Satara. Mahadji's brother Trimbakrao Purandare led a 20,000-strong force against him. Gaekwad defeated him at Nimb, a small town north of Satara. He then marched to Satara, where he was received by Tarabai. However, Trimbakrao re-formed his army and on 15 March 1751, he attacked Gaekwad's army, which was encamped on the banks of the Venna River. Gaekwad was defeated in this battle, and forced to retreat with heavy losses. Trimbakrao kept pursuing him and cornered his force near a gorge in the Krishna river valley.

Meanwhile, on hearing about the rebellion, Balaji Rao left the Mughal frontier, and quickly advanced towards Satara, covering 400 miles in 13 days. He reached Satara on 24 April, and stormed the Yavateshwar garrison, defeating Tarabai's forces. He then joined Trimbakrao, who had been keeping a watch on Gaekwad's army. Gaekwad was compelled to declare ceasefire and meet Balaji Rao to discuss the terms of a peace treaty. Balaji Rao demanded from him half of Gujarat's territories in addition to a war indemnity of  2,500,000. Damaji refused to sign an agreement, stating that he was only a subordinate, and asked Balaji Rao to consult Umabai. On 30 April, Balaji Rao launched a surprise evening attack, and Damaji's camp surrendered without resistance. Balaji Rao then surrounded the Satara fort, and asked Tarabai to release Chhatrapati Rajaram II, whose physical and mental condition had deteriorated considerably. Tarabai refused, and Balaji Rao left for Pune, since a siege of the well-provisioned and strong Satara fort would not be easy.

Later, a section of Tarabai's troops in the Satara garrison rebelled against her. Although she crushed the mutiny, she realized that it would be difficult to continue the fight against Balaji Rao. She, therefore, agreed to a peace treaty. She met Balaji Rao in Pune, and accepted the superiority of the Peshwa's office. She agreed to dismiss her lieutenant Baburao Jadhav, whom the Peshwa disliked. In return, the Peshwa forgave her. On 14 September 1752, the two took oaths at Khandoba temple in Jejuri, promising mutual peace. At this oath ceremony, Tarabai swore that Rajaram II was not her grandson, but an impostor from the Gondhali caste. Nevertheless, the Peshwa retained Rajaram II as the titular Chhatrapati and a powerless figurehead.

In May 1751, Balaji Rao had arrested Damaji Gaekwad and his relatives, and sent them to Pune. Sometime later, the Dabhades were also arrested, and deprived of their jagirs and titles. In Pune, Balaji Rao repeatedly pressurized Damaji to cede half of Gujarat on behalf of Yashwant Rao Dabhade. Damaji kept refusing, and on 19 July 1751, Balaji Rao placed him and his dewan Ramchandra Baswant in strict confinement. On 14 November, he sent them to captivity in Lohagad. A few weeks later, Ramchandra Baswant escaped to Gujarat. As a result, Balaji Rao ordered Damaji to be put in iron chains at Lohagad. He then sent a military expedition to Gujarat, under his brother Raghunath Rao. Raghunath Rao managed to recover revenues from Surat, but could not advance north of the Tapti river. Meanwhile, Balaji Rao received a setback when his general Shankarji Keshav Phadke was defeated at the siege of Parner. As a result, he decided to seek reconciliation with the Gaekwads. In March 1752, Damaji finally agreed to abandon Dabhades and join Balaji Rao. In return, he was made the Maratha chief of Gujarat, and Balaji Rao offered him assistance in expelling the Mughals from Gujarat. Gaekwad promised to pay an annual tribute of  525,000 to Peshwa in addition to a one-time payment of  1,500,000. He was also asked to maintain a cavalry of 20,000 horses in service of the Peshwa.

Campaign against the Nizam 

In 1751, Balaji Rao had invaded the territories of Nizam of Hyderabad Salabat Jung, who was supported by the French Governor-General of Pondicherry Marquis de Bussy-Castelnau. Due to Tarabai's rebellion and the French-trained enemy troops, the Marathas had to retreat. In 1752, Balaji Rao launched a fresh attack against the Nizam. He also sought support of the English to counter the French, but the English refused to get involved in the conflict. The Marathas wanted Salabat Jung's brother Ghazi ud-Din Khan to be appointed as the Nizam; as he had promised them a payment of  6,000,000 among other favours. However, Khan was poisoned to death by his step-mother. Ultimately, Balaji Rao and Marquis de Bussy-Castelnau concluded a peace treaty. Raghoji Bhonsle also agreed to peace on the condition that Nizam would grant him some jagirs in Berar.

Relations with Rajputs 

Balaji's father Baji Rao aimed to establish a Hindu Padshahi (Hindu kingship) in India, and maintained good relations with the Hindu Rajputs. However, during Balaji Rao's tenure, the Marathas alienated the Rajput rulers.

When Jai Singh II of Jaipur died in 1743, a war of succession broke out between his sons Ishwari Singh and Madho Singh. Madho was supported by Jagat Singh II of Mewar and Ummed Singh of Bundi. The Marathas, however, initially supported Ishwari, simply because he offered them more money. Later, Jagat Singh was able to enlist Malhar Rao Holkar on Madho's side, while Jayappa Rao Scindia continued to support Ishwari. This episode not only spoiled the Maratha relations with the Rajputs, but also resulted in internal strife among the Marathas. Madho Singh later sought arbitration from Balaji Rao, who personally came to Jaipur and convinced Ishwari Singh to cede 4 mahals to Madho Singh. Ishwari Singh initially agreed, but refused to abide by his promise after Balaji returned to Pune. Malhar Rao Holkar then not only forcefully captured the mahals for Madho, but also imposed a tribute on Ishwari Singh. In 1750, the Marathas declared a war on Ishwari Singh for his failure to pay the arrears. Ishwari Singh was desperate as he did not have sufficient money to pay off the Marathas, and he could not impose excessive taxes on his citizens. As a result, he committed suicide by consuming poison.

After Ishawari Singh's death, Madho Singh became the ruler of Jaipur. However, he no longer trusted the Marathas, having seen their treatment of his elder brother. He participated in battles against the Marathas, until Safdarjung intervened and convinced the Marathas to leave with an apology and some compensation. After Safdarjung's death, the Marathas again invaded the Rajput territories. This forced Madho Singh to seek help from Safdarjung's successor Shuja-ud-Daula as well as the Afghan king Ahmad Shah Durrani (Abdali).

In 1749, Abhai Singh of Jodhpur (Marwar) died, leading to a war of succession between Bakht Singh and Ram Singh. Ram Singh sought help from Jayappa Scindia. By the time Scindia marched to Jodhpur in September 1752, Bakhat Singh had died. He was succeeded by his son Bijay Singh, who sought help against the Marathas from the Mughals, the Rohillas and Madho Singh. With Madho Singh's help, Maharaja Vijay Singh resisted the Marathas for a year, before he agreed to peace talks. During one such peace negotiation, Jayappa Rao Scindia was assassinated by emissaries of Vijay Singh of Marwar in July 1755. This led to further hostilities between the Marathas and the Rajputs until Dattaji Rao Scindia concluded a peace treaty in February 1756.

Relations with the Jats 

The Marathas-Jat relations also worsened during Balaji Rao's reign. Balaji's younger brother Raghunath Rao wanted a share of revenues from the prosperous Bharatpur State. Suraj Mal, the ruler of this state, had interfered in Jaipur politics in support of Ishwari Singh. This had antagonized Maratha chiefs like Malhar Rao Holkar, who had supported Madho. In 1754, the Mughal wazir Safdarjung sought Suraj Mal's help against the Mughal emperor. To counter him, the imperial loyalist Imad-ul-Mulk, sought Maratha help. Raghunath Rao used this opportunity and sent a force led by Malhar Rao Holkar to Bharatpur. Suraj Mal tried to avoid a war by offering him  4,000,000; but, Raghunath Rao was not satisfied with the offer. The Marathas besieged Bharatpur's Kumher fort in early 1754 for around four months, before a peace treaty was concluded. The Marathas accepted an offer by Suraj Mal to pay  3,000,000 in three yearly installments.

Relations with the Mughals 

During Baji Rao's tenure, the Mughals had nominally granted the Malwa to the Marathas, but the control was not actually passed to the Marathas. After becoming Peshwa, Balaji Rao approached the Mughal emperor through Jai Singh II, and managed to get appointed as the Deputy Governor of Malwa (with Ahmad Shah as the titular Governor). In return, he pledged faithfulness to the Mughal emperor. He also agreed to keep a force of 500 soldiers at the emperor's court, in addition to providing a force of 4,000 soldiers on a need basis.

In 1748, Javed Khan, a rival of the Mughal wazir Safdarjung invited the new Nizam of Hyderabad Nasir Jung, to join an alliance against the wazir. Safdarjung requested Maratha support against Nasir Jung. Balaji Rao dispatched Scindia and Holkar chiefs to prevent Nasir Jung from reaching Delhi, and thus, saved Safdarjung.

Starting in 1748, the Afghan king Ahmad Shah Durrani (Abdali) launched several invasions of India, forcing the Mughals to seek Maratha help. In 1752, the Rohillas of the Doab region rebelled against the Mughal emperor. They defeated Safdarjung in a battle, and invited Durrani to invade India. Once again, Safdarjung sought assistance from the Marathas, who helped him crush the rebellion. The Marathas and the Mughals signed an agreement in 1752. The Marathas agreed to help the Mughals defeat external aggressions as well as internal rebellions. The Mughals agreed to appoint Peshwa Balaji Rao as the Governor of Ajmer and Agra. The Marathas were also granted the right to collect chauth from Lahore, Multan, Sindh, and some districts of Hissar and Moradabad. However, the Mughal emperor had also ceded Lahore and Multan to Ahmad Shah Durrani in order to pacify him. In addition, he did not ratify the transfer of Rajput-ruled territories like Ajmer to the Marathas. This brought the Marathas in conflict with Durranis as well as Rajputs.

Maratha Expansion into Bengal 

From 1741 to 1751, the Marathas under Raghuji Bhonsle invaded Bengal six times. The first one in 1741, The second in 1742,  as also the third in 1744 and the fourth in 1745 were led by Raghuji himself. The fifth in 1747 and the sixth in 1748 were undertaken by Janoji and Sabaji respectively. These invasions caused heavy destruction in the armies of the Nawab of Bengal. Nawab Alivardi Khan was successful in repelling only the first invasion in 1741. In 1743 two Maratha armies invaded - one belonged to Raghoji Bhonsle and the other of Balaji Rao. Alivardi Khan was obliged to pay him a subsidie, promising to pay him Chauth tax. The continuous conflict took a heavy toll on the population of Bengal. The Hindu Maratha warriors invaded and occupied western Bengal up to the Hooghly River.

During this period, warriors called as "Bargis", perpetrated atrocities against the local population, against Hindu Bengalis Muslims and Biharis. As reported in Burdwan Kingdom's and European sources, the Bargis are said to have plundered villages, and Jan Kersseboom, chief of the Dutch East India Company factory in Bengal, estimated that perhaps 400,000 Hindu civilians in Western Bengal and Bihar were dead owing to the invasion of Bargis.> The resulting casualties of Bargi onslaught against in Bengal are considered to be among the deadliest massacres in Indian history. According to the 18th-century Bengali text Maharashtra Purana written by Gangaram:

In 1751, the Marathas signed a peace treaty with the Nawab of Bengal, according to which Mir Habib (a former courtier of Alivardi Khan, who had defected to the Marathas) was made provincial governor of Orissa under nominal control of the Nawab of Bengal. It made The Nawab of Bengal a tributary to the Marathas who agrees to pay Rs. 1.2 million annually as the chauth of Bengal and Bihar, and the Marathas agreed not to invade Bengal again. The Nawab of Bengal also paid Rs. 3.2 million to the Marathas, towards the arrears of chauth for the preceding years. The chauth was paid annually by the Nawab of Bengal up to 1758, until the East India Company took over.

Conflict with the Durrani Empire

After his initial invasions of India, Ahmed Shah Durrani appointed his son Timur Shah Durrani as the governor of Punjab and Kashmir. Balaji Rao then dispatched Raghunath Rao to check the advance of the Durranis. In 1758, Raghunath Rao conquered Lahore and Peshawar, and drove out Timur Shah Durrani. This was the high-water mark of Maratha expansion, where the boundaries of their empire extended north of the Sindhu river all the way down south to northern Kerala. The Marathas thus became the Durrani's major rivals in the north-western part of the subcontinent. Meanwhile, the Marathas had reduced the Mughal emperor to a figurehead, and Balaji Rao talked of placing his son Vishwasrao on the Mughal throne. The Mughal loyalist Muslim intellectuals of Delhi were alarmed at these developments, and appealed Durrani to check the rising Maratha power.

Under these circumstances, Ahmad Shah Durrani launched a fresh invasion of India, reaching Lahore by the end of 1759. He gained allies in the Rohilla noble Najib-ud-Daula and the Nawab of Oudh Shuja-ud-Daula. Balaji Rao responded to the Durrani invasion by dispatching a large force commanded by Sadashiv Rao Bhau. This force was supplemented by the contingents of Holkar, Scindia, Gaikwad and Govind Pant Bundele. The Jat ruler Suraj Mal of Bharatpur also joined the Marathas, but later left the alliance due to a misunderstanding with Bhau.

Between 1759 and 1761, the Durranis and the Marathas fought each other in several skirmishes and small battles, with varying results. Due to the extended duration of the siege of the Maratha garrison at Panipat which Balaji's reinforcements were supposed to break but never reached beyond the Narmada, the Durranis decisively defeated the famished and under-equipped Maratha army in the Third Battle of Panipat on 14 January 1761. According to Shuresh Sharma, "It was Balaji Bajirao's love of pleasure which was responsible for Panipat. He delayed at Paithan celebrating his second marriage until December 27th, when it was too late."

Death 

The defeat at Panipat resulted in heavy losses for the Marathas, and was a huge setback for Peshwa Balaji Rao. He received the news of the defeat of Panipat on 24 January 1761 at Bhilsa, while leading a reinforcement force. Besides several important generals, he had lost his own son Vishwasrao and cousin Sadashivrao Bhau in the Battle of Panipat. He fell in depression and died on 23 June 1761, and was succeeded by his younger son Madhav Rao I.

Gallery

In popular culture
In 1994 Hindi TV series The Great Maratha, Peshwa Balji Bajirao's character was portrayed by Bal Dhuri.
In the 2014 Indian Marathi-language film, Rama Madhav, he is portrayed by Ravindra Mankani.
In the 2015 Bollywood film Bajirao Mastani, Ayush Tandon essays the role of a young Balaji Bajirao.
In the 2019 Bollywood film, Panipat, Peshwa Balaji Bajirao was portrayed by Mohnish Bahl.

See also 
 Koli rebellions
 List of Koli people
 List of Koli states and clans

Further reading

 Balaji Bajirao (Nanasaheb) Peshwa by Prof. S. S. Puranik
 Solstice at Panipat by Uday S. Kulkarni, Mula Mutha Publishers, 2nd edition, 2012.
 Panipat by Vishwas Patil, Rajhamns publishers.

References

Peshwa dynasty
1720 births
1761 deaths